I Corps, 1st Corps, or First Corps may refer to:

France
 1st Army Corps (France)
 I Cavalry Corps (Grande Armée), a cavalry unit of the Imperial French Army during the Napoleonic Wars
 I Corps (Grande Armée), a unit of the Imperial French Army during the Napoleonic Wars

Germany
 I Cavalry Corps (German Empire), a unit of the Imperial German Army
 I Corps (German Empire), a unit of the Imperial German Army
 I Reserve Corps (German Empire), a unit of the Imperial German Army
 I Royal Bavarian Corps, a unit of the Bavarian Army and the Imperial German Army
 I Royal Bavarian Reserve Corps, a unit of the Bavarian Army and the Imperial German Army
 I Army Corps (Wehrmacht), a unit in World War II
 I SS Panzer Corps, a unit in World War II

India
 I Corps (British India)
 I Corps (India)

Russia and Soviet Union
 1st Army Corps (Russian Empire)
 1st Guards Assault Aviation Corps 
 1st Guards Mechanized Corps (Soviet Union)
 1st Airborne Corps (Soviet Union)
 1st Army Corps (Armed Forces of South Russia), a unit in the Russian Civil War
 1st Army Corps (Soviet Union)
 1st Assault Aviation Corps
 1st Cavalry Corps (Russian Empire)
 1st Rifle Corps, Soviet Union

United Kingdom
 I Corps (United Kingdom)
 I Airborne Corps (United Kingdom)

United States
 I Corps (United States)
 I Amphibious Corps
 I Armored Corps (United States)
 I Corps (Union Army)
 First Corps, Army of Northern Virginia
 First Corps, Army of Tennessee
 First Army Corps (Spanish-American War)
 I Field Force, Vietnam

Others
 I ANZAC Corps, Australia and New Zealand
 I Corps (Australia)
 I Corps (Belgium)
 I Corps (Bosnia and Herzegovina)
 I Canadian Corps
 I Corps (Czechoslovakia)
 Finnish I Corps (Winter War)
 I Army Corps (Greece)
 I Corps (North Korea)
 I Corps (Ottoman Empire)
 I Corps (Pakistan)
 Polish I Corps (disambiguation), several units
 1st Territorial Army Corps (Romania)
 I Corps (South Korea)
 I Corps (South Vietnam)
 1st Corps (Vietnam People's Army)
 1st Corps (Yugoslav Partisans), during World War II

See also 
 List of military corps by number
 1st Army Corps (disambiguation)
 1st Army (disambiguation)
 1st Brigade (disambiguation)
 1st Division (disambiguation)
 1st Regiment (disambiguation)
 1 Squadron (disambiguation)